Franches-Montagnes may refer to:

 Franches-Montagnes District, one of the three districts of the canton of Jura, Switzerland
 Franches-Montagnes, a horse breed, also known as a Freiberger.